The tody-flycatchers are several species of birds in the family Tyrannidae:

 Genus Poecilotriccus
 Rufous-crowned tody-flycatcher, Poecilotriccus ruficeps
 Lulu's tody-flycatcher, Poecilotriccus luluae
 White-cheeked tody-flycatcher, Poecilotriccus albifacies
 Black-and-white tody-flycatcher, Poecilotriccus capitalis
 Buff-cheeked tody-flycatcher, Poecilotriccus senex
 Ruddy tody-flycatcher, Poecilotriccus russatus
 Ochre-faced tody-flycatcher, Poecilotriccus plumbeiceps
 Smoky-fronted tody-flycatcher, Poecilotriccus fumifrons
 Rusty-fronted tody-flycatcher, Poecilotriccus latirostris
 Slaty-headed tody-flycatcher, Poecilotriccus sylvia
 Golden-winged tody-flycatcher, Poecilotriccus calopterus
 Black-backed tody-flycatcher, Poecilotriccus pulchellus
 Genus Todirostrum:
 Spotted tody-flycatcher, Todirostrum maculatum
 Yellow-lored tody-flycatcher, Todirostrum poliocephalum
 Short-tailed tody-flycatcher, Todirostrum viridanum
 Black-headed tody-flycatcher, Todirostrum nigriceps
 Painted tody-flycatcher, Todirostrum pictum
 Common tody-flycatcher, Todirostrum cinereum
 Yellow-browed tody-flycatcher, Todirostrum chrysocrotaphum

Birds by common name